Women's Viewpoint may refer to:

Woman's Viewpoint (magazine), an American woman's journal published between 1923–1927
Women's Viewpoint (TV programme), a 1951 British discussion television programme